Erik-Jan van den Boogaard (born 19 August 1964) is a Dutch former professional footballer who played as a striker.

Club career
He played in the Netherlands for PSV Eindhoven and got relegated to the Eerste Divisie with MVV in 1986, before a surprise move to France with Rennes where he became a club hero after shooting them to Ligue 1 in 1990. He was then sold for financial reasons to FC Rouen and finished his career prematurely in Switzerland with Lausanne Sports.

International career
He was a member of the Dutch squad at the 1983 FIFA World Youth Championship and featured in two matches as a late sub.

References

External links
 PSV profile
 Career stats - Rennes

1964 births
Living people
Footballers from Amsterdam
Association football forwards
Dutch footballers
Netherlands youth international footballers
Eredivisie players
Ligue 2 players
Swiss Super League players
PSV Eindhoven players
MVV Maastricht players
Stade Rennais F.C. players
FC Rouen players
FC Lausanne-Sport players
Dutch expatriate footballers
Expatriate footballers in France
Expatriate footballers in Switzerland
Dutch expatriate sportspeople in France
Dutch expatriate sportspeople in Switzerland